The 2010–11 season was the 123rd season of competitive association football and the 4th consecutive season in League One played by Walsall Football Club, a professional association football club based in Walsall, West Midlands, England.  The team reached the second round of the FA Cup, losing to Torquay United. There was a change of manager in January.

Season summary 
Having finished 10th in the previous season, Walsall started the season poorly, losing six of their first eight league games. 

On 4 January 2011, manager Chris Hutchins was sacked with the club bottom of the league and having recorded just 5 league wins. On 21 January 2011, Dean Smith was appointed as manager after a successful spell as caretaker manager following the dismissal of Chris Hutchins. The saddlers finished the season in 20th place, 1 point above the relegation zone.

Incumbents
Manager–Chris Hutchings (until 4 January 2011), Dean Smith thereafter.

Chairman–Jeff Bonser.

Shirt Sponsors–Walsall Hospice.

Kit Manufacturers–Admiral.

First-team squad
Squad at end of season

Left club during season

Competitions

Results

League One

FA Cup

League Cup

Football League Trophy

References

Walsall F.C. seasons
Walsall